The Godavari Arch Bridge is a bowstring-girder bridge that spans the Godavari River in Rajahmundry, India. It is the latest of the three bridges that span the Godavari river at Rajahmundry. The Havelock Bridge being the earliest, was built in 1897, and having served its full utility, was decommissioned in 1997.

The second bridge known as the Godavari Bridge is a truss bridge and is India's third longest road-cum-rail bridge crossing a water body.

The bridge is one of the longest span prestressed concrete arch bridges in Asia.
It has been widely used to represent Rajahmundry in arts, media, and culture. It is one of the recognised symbols of Rajahmundry.

Geography
The bridge is built across the Godavari River, the largest river in South India at over  length.

The bridge is located in two channels, the Kovvur channel and the Rajahmundry channel, and hence the bridge is also known as the Kovvur-Rajahmundry Bridge.

History

Earlier Bridges

This bridge is the third in the series of the bridges that spans the Godavari river at Rajahmundry. The earliest bridge is the Havelock bridge, which was built in 1897 by Frederick Thomas Granville Walton. It was decommissioned in 1997 as it had served its full utility. The Godavari Arch bridge was actually built to replace the Havelock bridge. Additionally, the Godavari Arch bridge is aligned parallel to the Old Godavari bridge, and is separated by a short distance of about 200 meters.

The second bridge is a railroad bridge, the Godavari bridge, built in 1960's as a part of doubling of railway track between Chennai – Howrah. This is a truss bridge, with the superstructure made of steel. It is in active service and carries a single railway track in the lower level, and two-way road, pedestrian pathways on the upper level. Initial plans for the construction of the Godavari Arch bridge consisted of a steel superstructure like the Godavari bridge. But later the concept of prestressed concrete girders was considered, and subsequently the designing was continued with the concrete girders.

Planning

Godavari Arch Bridge was to be built to replace the Havelock Bridge, which had served its full utility. Initial plans made for the bridge considered a superstructure made of steel. But, as the usage of concrete as construction material had become popular since its introduction in the 1930s, the issue of type of superstructure was re–examined by the Indian Railways. It was decided to examine the possibility of evolving a prestressed concrete bridge with a  span. Firms were pre-qualified for the purpose with preferred options suggested for submission of offers, and for the preference of steel girder or concrete girder.

Among the three firms which were shortlisted to submit proposals, two firms opted for concrete bridge and one for steel bridge. On the basis of these proposals, the authorities at Indian Railways prepared the Terms of Reference prescribing the design criteria. Following this, the three qualified firms, the Research Design and Standards Organization and the Railway Board were taken into consideration to indicate their views and comments on the Terms of Reference. And, subsequently the design criteria for the bridge was finalised.

The proposals received from the three firms were examined by Proof Consultants who recommended that the design offered by Hindustan Construction Company be accepted. It proposed the bowstring-girder type concrete arch of span  with prestressed concrete box girder to act as the tie. Following this recommendation, the proposal of Hindustan Construction Company was accepted considering its technical feasibility and financial viability. Hindustan Construction Company won the order to plan, design and build the bridge.

Construction
The bridge, built by the Hindustan Construction Company, for the Indian Railways, was designed by Bureau BBR, Switzerland, and checked by Leonardt Andrä and Partners, Germany.
Construction on the bridge began in 1991 and lasted till 1997. It was commissioned for passenger traffic in March 1997 and became fully operational for running trains by the Indian Railways from 2003.

Description

Specifications
The twin arches, box girders, struts are all made of prestressed concrete.

These are connected laterally with struts (known as Vierendeel truss) and box girder.

The substructure of the bridge consists of 28 piers.

Design aspects
The superstructure of the bridge is of the bow-string girder type. While designing, the projected speed for the trains was taken as 160 km per hour. As the location of the bridge is in the Seismic Zone I, seismic load has not been accounted for in the design.

Arches
The arches are designed to share 80% of the dead load and live load transferred from the hangers and thus a plays a critical role of relieving the flexural and shear stresses on the girder. Twelve sinking supports are provided at each hanger location connecting with the girder.

Hangers
Each span of the bridge has 24 hangers, which are further divided into six types depending on their length. Each Dina Hangar is made of 49 high tensile steel wires of  diameter each. These wires run parallel to each other and are encased in a high tensile polythene pipe, which is cement grouted.

Girders
The box girders are made of M42 grade concrete. Each girder was prestressed with 16 longitudinal cables, which in turn were prestressed to a force of 2950 kN each.

The box girder, which functions as the deck of the bridge and carries the live load, comprises end diaphragm ( thick), which has inspection windows.

The design of the girder accounts for loading conditions of full span train load, half span train load, one third span train load and so forth with due accounting of temperature variation of ±. At each stage of casting of the girders (seven stages of casting were involved for each girder from girder stressing to removal of form work) forces generated in the arch section were studied and accounted. The girder casting also ensured that no cracks appeared in the arches at any stage.

Bearings
The bridge has been provided with pot bearings, of 1050 tonnes capacity. One each pier, the girder is supported on four pot bearings of three types: PNa, PNe, PN.

The PNa type bearing (which facilitates free sliding in both directions) on one pier and PNe type (slides only in one direction) in the succeeding pier and PN type which is fixed type.

Their placement ensures that only longitudinal movement takes place without permitting any lateral moment.

Three sets of bearings were imported from Switzerland, while the balance bearings were made by BBR (India) Pvt Ltd, India.

Maintenance

Corrective action
After the bridge was constructed, the railway authorities carried out settlement studies of all 28 piers in view of the foundation conditions on which they were founded. Since the rotation in the vertical plane exceeded the prescribed value for differential settlement, BBR, consultants to Hindustan Construction Company (HCC), anticipated that the top plate of the bearing is "likely touch the bottom plate thereby damaging the bearing." This was achieved by using Conbextra HES (which has properties of free flow, achieving high early strength and quick setting), a cementation material manufactured by M/s. FOSROC, India. This was done by careful planning of stopping train operations (by taking two breaks of short intervals) over the bridge during the period of rectification supported by eight 400 tonnes capacity hydraulic jacks with lock nut and shim plates’ arrangement.

See also
Godavari Bridge
Old Godavari Bridge
Godavari River

References

Bibliography

Bridges completed in 2003
Bridges in Andhra Pradesh
Railway bridges in India
Tied arch bridges
2003 establishments in Andhra Pradesh
Bridges over the Godavari river
Buildings and structures in Rajahmundry
Transport in Rajahmundry
Buildings and structures in East Godavari district
Transport in East Godavari district
Buildings and structures in West Godavari district
Transport in West Godavari district